Epilepsy and driving is a personal and safety issue. A person with a seizure disorder that causes lapses in consciousness may be putting the public at risk from their operation of a motor vehicle. Not only can a seizure itself cause an accident, but anticonvulsants often have side effects that include drowsiness. People with epilepsy are more likely to be involved in a traffic accident than people who do not have the condition, although reports range from minimally more likely up to seven times more likely.

It is for this reason that most people diagnosed with epilepsy are prohibited or restricted by their local laws from operating vehicles. However, most places have exceptions built into their laws for those who can prove that they have stabilized their condition. Individuals who may be exempt from such restrictions or may have fewer restrictions include those who had seizures as a result of a medical condition that has been cured, from a physician's experimental medication change that failed, as an isolated incident, whose seizures occur only while asleep, or who may be able to predict their seizures in order to ensure that they do not lose consciousness behind the wheel of a moving vehicle. 

The first seizure-related automobile crash occurred at the turn of the 19th century. Since then, laws have been enacted all over the world regarding driving for people with epilepsy. There is an ongoing debate in bioethics over who should bear the burden of ensuring that a person with epilepsy does not drive a car or fly an aircraft.

Laws
Some countries prohibit people who have ever had a seizure from driving. In these countries, it is common for people with epilepsy to hide their condition from authorities in order not to be denied a driver's license. Other places allow those who have had seizures to drive after a seizure-free period, which ranges from six months to a year. EU (European Union) harmonisation of periods of freedom from seizure means the periods shown below for EU states is wrong - now 6 months for an isolated seizure, 12 months for a second or more seizures within 5 years, whether or not antiepileptic drugs are taken.  For drivers of heavy lorries and buses the seizure-free period is five years without drugs.

Epilepsy driving laws by country

United States
In the U.S., people with epilepsy can drive if their seizures are controlled with medication or other treatment and they meet the licensing requirements in their state. How long they have to be free of seizures varies in different states, but it is most likely to be between six months to a year. In 44 of the 50 states, the burden is placed on patients to report their condition to appropriate licensing authorities so that their privileges can be revoked where appropriate. Six states place the burden of reporting on the patient's physician. After reporting is carried out, it is usually the driver's licensing agency that decides to revoke or restrict a driver's license.

Restrictions on operating a commercial vehicle are often stricter than those for a private automobile. Federal law in the United States prohibits people with epilepsy from operating a commercial vehicle across state lines, even if seizures are controlled.

Studies have shown that in states where drivers are required to report their own condition, about 1/3 of licensed drivers comply with this law. The most recent trend adopted by many states allows those who have been seizure-free for 90 days to drive. This leniency has been passed with the hope that drivers will be more willing to report their health conditions.

Laws by state

Canada
The following are the driving laws for people with epilepsy in each province/territory of Canada:

Laws by province

India 
In India, people with epilepsy are not permitted to drive. The document puts the onus on both applicant to reveal if the person loses consciousness due to any cause and medical practitioner to provide a certificate that the applicant, to the best of the professional's judgment, has epilepsy, vertigo or any mental ailment likely to affect driving ability.

Flying
While most places allow people with their seizures under control to drive a car, laws regarding the operation of an airplane generally are much more strict. In the United States, the Federal Aviation Administration often prohibits anyone with epilepsy from being issued a pilot's license, even if the seizures are controlled by a medication or have completely ceased. The only epilepsy patients who may be issued a license are those who have had seizures during childhood, but have been seizure-free since, and have a normal EEG. Those with Rolandic seizures may be allowed to fly if they are seizure-free for at least four years. Children who have had a febrile seizure prior to the age of five may fly if they are off of all seizure medication for at least three years. Regardless, all medical records must be submitted to the FAA.

As of 2017, normally, if a person is taking medications for epilepsy, and is free of seizures for five full years, and wishes to obtain a pilot's license for a large aircraft, including any jet, they must then work with their physician and neurologist to wean themselves, and go off the medications. Once the medications have been stopped, if they remain seizure-free for another five full years, they may apply. In any case, the full medical records are reviewed by the FAA, who has the final call and the sole discretion to make modifications and exceptions (Interview with representative of FAA at General Wayne Downing Peoria International Airport).

Accidents caused by a seizure while driving
A study conducted by the National Center for Health Statistics found that fatalities caused by seizures that occurred while driving were relatively rare, resulting in less than 0.2% of all traffic-related fatalities in the years 1995–97.

In March 2002, a Frederick, Maryland man was charged with vehicular manslaughter after a seizure he had while operating a motor vehicle resulted in an accident that killed four people. The man had been using a nerve stimulating device to treat his epileptic condition rather than seeking medical treatment. He had been using this home remedy out of fear that if he had reported his condition to a physician, he would be stripped of his license.

An Essex, UK man was jailed for an accident he caused on April 18, 2008, that killed a female pedestrian. He had already been ordered by a judge not to drive. His sentence was 8 years, and he was disqualified from driving for 10 years.

A 28-year-old Halethorpe, Maryland woman was sentenced to 30 weekends in jail in April 2009 after being convicted of vehicular manslaughter stemming from a fatal 2007 crash. The woman was also sentenced to 10 months of home detention, five years of supervised probation, during which time she may not drive a car, and a 10-year suspended prison sentence.

In Galway, Ireland, a 41-year-old man with a lifelong history of epilepsy was jailed for 7 years and disqualified from driving for 20 years for causing the death of two baby sisters on October 21, 2012.

References

External links
 Epilepsy driving rights in the United States: General information and database of state laws

Epilepsy
Traffic law
Driving